Self Control is the third studio album by American singer Laura Branigan, released in April 1984, by Atlantic Records. The album peaked at number 23 on the US Billboard 200 and has been certified platinum by the Recording Industry Association of America (RIAA). Internationally, it charted within the top five in several continental European countries.

Four singles were released from the album, including Branigan's cover version of Raf's "Self Control", which was a commercial success, peaking at number four on the US Billboard Hot 100 and topping the charts in Canada and several European countries. Additionally, "The Lucky One" peaked at number 20 on the Billboard Hot 100, while her cover of Umberto Tozzi's "Ti amo" reached number two in Australia and number five in Canada.

A remastered and expanded edition of Self Control was released on April 25, 2013, by Gold Legion, including remixes of "The Lucky One" and "Satisfaction", as well as the extended version of "Self Control".

Track listing

Notes
  signifies English lyrics
  signifies original music
  signifies original words

Personnel
Credits adapted from the liner notes of Self Control.

Musicians

 Laura Branigan – vocals
 Carlos Vega – drums
 John Robinson – drums
 Michael Landau – guitar
 Dann Huff – guitar
 Paul Jackson Jr. – guitar
 Nathan East – bass
 Robbie Buchanan – pianos, synthesizers ; arrangements 
 Harold Faltermeyer – additional synthesizers ; arrangements 
 Larry O. Williams – saxophone 
 Thomas Kelly – background vocals
 Steve George – background vocals
 Bill Champlin – background vocals
 Richard Page – background vocals
 Tommy Funderburk – background vocals
 Jon Joyce – background vocals
 Jim Haas – background vocals
 Joe Chemay – background vocals
 Beth Anderson – background vocals
 Joe Pizzulo – background vocals

Technical
 Jürgen Koppers – engineering, mixing
 Harold Faltermeyer – additional engineering
 Peter Luedemann – additional engineering
 Jeremy Smith – additional engineering
 Gary Skardina – additional engineering
 Keith Buckley – engineering assistance
 Jon Ingoldsby – engineering assistance
 Matt Forger – engineering assistance
 Brian Gardner – mastering
 Jack White – production, executive production
 Robbie Buchanan – production

Artwork
 Tim Lohman – front cover photo
 Paul Lohman – creative direction
 Bob Defrin – art direction
 Lynn Dreese Breslin – design
 Daniela Scaramuzza – back cover photo

Charts

Weekly charts

Year-end charts

Certifications

Notes

References

1984 albums
Albums produced by Jack White (music producer)
Atlantic Records albums
Laura Branigan albums